The Super City Rangers were a New Zealand basketball team based in Auckland. The Rangers competed in the National Basketball League (NBL) and played their home games across multiple venues in Auckland.

Team history
The Waitakere Rangers debuted in the National Basketball League (NBL) in 1990 and withdrew following the 1995 season. Waitakere Basketball continued to hold a valid NBL licence for years after the Rangers withdrew but were unable to reactivate it.

The Rangers did see some success in the Conference Basketball League (CBL), winning the league in 1996 and finishing runners-up in 2006.

The team reemerged and returned to the NBL after 18 years as a consolidated Auckland franchise in 2013. As the Super City Rangers, the team reached the NBL final in 2016, where they lost 94–82 to the Wellington Saints.

In August 2019, the Rangers franchise was terminated by the NBL due to multiple breaches of their participation agreement, including having outstanding debts and fees owed to the league. A review of the franchise had started prior to the conclusion of the 2019 season, citing missed deadlines for league payments and late payments to players as concerning issues that raised red flags.

References

External links
 Archived team website
 Australiabasket.com profile

Basketball teams in New Zealand
National Basketball League (New Zealand) teams
Basketball teams established in 1990
1990 establishments in New Zealand
Basketball teams disestablished in 2019
2019 disestablishments in New Zealand